Snijders is a Dutch occupational surname. Snijder literally means "cutter", referring to a taylor or a woodcarver. People with this surname include:

Ad Snijders (1929–2010), Dutch painter, collagist and a social activist
Arsenio Snijders (born 1990), Dutch footballer
 (1923–1990), Surinamese composer, conductor and musician
Frans Snijders (1579–1657), Flemish painter of animals and still life
Genaro Snijders (born 1989), Dutch footballer
 (born 1953), Surinamese composer, conductor, and trombonist, nephew of Eddy
Ivo Snijders (born 1980), Dutch rower
Jan Snijders (born 1943), Dutch judoka, twin brother of Peter
 (born 1987), Dutch footballer
Lee Snijders, American designer, television host of "Design on a Dime"
Mark Snijders (born 1972), Dutch footballer
Peter Snijders (born 1943), Dutch judoka, twin brother of Jan
Ronald Snijders (born 1949), Dutch-Surinamese jazz flutist and author, son of Eddy
Tom Snijders (born 1949), Dutch statistician
Wende Snijders (born 1978), Dutch singer
Wouter Snijders (1928–2020), Dutch judge and legal scholar

Occupational surnames
Dutch-language surnames